Anton Ivanov may refer to:
 Anton Ivanov (badminton) (born 1987), Russian badminton player
 Anton Ivanov (politician) (born 1985), Russian politician
 Anton Ivanov (sprinter) (born 1971), former Bulgarian sprinter
 Anton Ivanov Kozinarov, Bulgarian communist activist and World War II resistance member
 Anton Ivanov-Goluboy (1818–1863), Russian painter
 Anton Alexandrovich Ivanov (born 1965), chairman of the Supreme Court of Arbitration of the Russian Federation
 Anton Ivanov, a Marvel Comics supervillain
 Anton Ivanov, an adaptation of the character in the MCU television series Agents of S.H.I.E.L.D.